Leeds Flat Site is an archaeological site located at Catskill in Greene County, New York.

It was listed on the National Register of Historic Places in 1998.

References

Archaeological sites on the National Register of Historic Places in New York (state)
Geography of Greene County, New York
National Register of Historic Places in Greene County, New York
Catskill, New York